The Preis der Deutschen Einheit is a Group 3 flat horse race in Germany open to thoroughbreds aged three years or older. It is run each year at Hoppegarten over a distance of 2,000 metres (about 1¼ miles).

The race is held on German Unity Day (Tag der Deutschen Einheit), a public holiday on October 3 commemorating the anniversary of German reunification.

History
The event was established in 1991, and it was initially classed at Listed level. It was originally sponsored by Zino Davidoff and alternatively titled the Prix Zino Davidoff. It was promoted to Group 3 status in 1992.

The Preis der Deutschen Einheit has had several different sponsors since the late 1990s, including Volkswagen from 2003 to 2005. Its current period of sponsorship by Westminster Unternehmensgruppe began in 2009.

Records
Most successful horse (2 wins):
 Terre de l'Home – 2002, 2003
 Russian Tango – 2010, 2011

Leading jockey (3 wins):
 Eduardo Pedroza – Terre de l'Home (2003), Russian Tango (2010, 2011)

Leading trainer (4 wins):
 Andreas Wöhler – Terre de l'Home (2002, 2003), Russian Tango (2010, 2011)

Winners

See also
 List of German flat horse races

References
 Racing Post / siegerlisten.com:
 1991, 
 , 

 galopp-sieger.de – Preis der Deutschen Einheit.
 horseracingintfed.com – International Federation of Horseracing Authorities – Preis der Deutschen Einheit (2012).
 pedigreequery.com – Preis der Deutschen Einheit – Hoppegarten.

Open middle distance horse races
Horse races in Germany
Recurring sporting events established in 1991
Sport in Brandenburg